The 2004–05 Dayton Flyers men's basketball team represented the University of Dayton during the 2003–04 NCAA Division I men's basketball season. The Flyers, led by second year head coach Brian Gregory, played their home games at the University of Dayton Arena and were members of the Atlantic 10 Conference. They finished the season 18–11, 10–6 in A-10 play, finishing second in the A-10's West division. The Flyers advanced to the quarterfinals of the Atlantic 10 tournament where their season was ended by Temple. Dayton was not selected to play in a postseason tournament, ending a streak of 5 consecutive postseason appearances.

Previous season
The 2003-04 Dayton Flyers finished the season with an overall record of 24–9, with a record of 12–4 in the Atlantic 10 regular season. The Flyers fell to Xavier in the Atlantic 10 tournament championship game. They received a bid to play in the NCAA tournament where they fell to DePaul in the first round.

Offseason

Departures

Incoming recruits

Roster

Schedule

|-
!colspan=9 style="background:#C40023; color:#75B2DD;"| Exhibition

|-
!colspan=9 style="background:#C40023; color:#75B2DD;"| Non-conference regular season

|-
!colspan=9 style="background:#C40023; color:#75B2DD;"| Atlantic 10 regular season

|-
!colspan=9 style="background:#C40023; color:#75B2DD;"| Atlantic 10 tournament

References

Dayton Flyers men's basketball seasons
Dayton
Dayton Flyers men's basketball
Dayton Flyers men's basketball